KOF or Kof may refer to:

 Kaph, letter of the Hebrew alphabet
The King of Fighters, a series of video games
The economic research institute Konjunkturforschungsstelle at ETH Zurich
Köf (disambiguation), various German locomotives